Halsey B. Frank is an American attorney who served as the United States Attorney for the District of Maine from 2017 to 2021. Prior to assuming the role of U.S. Attorney, he served as an Assistant United States Attorney for the District of Maine. Frank previously served as an Assistant United States Attorney in the District of Columbia and as a trial attorney in the torts branch of the civil division in the United States Department of Justice. He has prosecuted a number of high-profile criminal cases in Maine. Frank was recommended for the position of U.S. Attorney by U.S. Senator Susan Collins. He was confirmed by the United States Senate on October 3, 2017. He was sworn into office on October 10, 2017. On February 8, 2021, he along with 55 other Trump-era attorneys were asked to resign. He resigned on February 28, 2021.

References

External links
 Biography at U.S. Department of Justice

Living people
Assistant United States Attorneys
Boston University School of Law alumni
Maine lawyers
United States Attorneys for the District of Maine
Wesleyan University alumni
21st-century American lawyers
Year of birth missing (living people)